Greece competed at the 2012 Summer Paralympics in London, United Kingdom, from August 29 to September 9, 2012. The Hellenic Paralympic Committee sent a total of 61 athletes, 47 men and 14 women, to compete in 9 sports. Greece finished 44th in the medal table, winning one gold medal and 12 in total.

Medalists

| width=78% align=left valign=top |

Multiple medallists
The following Greek athletes won multiple medals at the 2012 Paralympic Games.

| width=22% align=left valign=top |

Archery

Women

|-
|align=left|Anna Tzika
|align=left|Ind. recurve Standing
|498
|13
|
|L 0-6
|colspan=4|did not advance
|}

Athletics

Men
Track events

Field events

Women
Track events

Field events

Boccia

Individual

Pairs and Teams

Cycling

Road
Men

Women

Track
Pursuit

Sprint

Time trial

Powerlifting

Men

Sailing

Shooting

Swimming

Men

Women

Wheelchair fencing

Men

See also
2012 Summer Paralympics
Greece at the Paralympics
Greece at the 2012 Summer Olympics

References

Nations at the 2012 Summer Paralympics
2012
2012 in Greek sport